Harold Anthony Caccia, Baron Caccia,  (21 December 1905 Pachmarhi, India – 31 October 1990 Builth Wells, Wales) was a British diplomat.

Caccia was the son of Major Anthony Mario Felix Caccia, Conservator of the Imperial Forest Service, and his wife Fanny Theodora Birch, daughter of Azim Salvatore Birch, of Pudlicote House, Charlbury, Oxfordshire.

He was educated at Summer Fields School, Eton College and Trinity College, Oxford and won a Blue at rugby union, playing at centre for Oxford in the Varsity match in 1926. He played cricket for Oxfordshire in the Minor Counties Championship between 1928 and 1938. In 1932 he married Anne Catherine Barstow, daughter of Sir George Barstow and Enid Lillian Lawrence.

Caccia entered the diplomatic service in 1929 and was posted to Peking and then to Athens and London where, in 1936, he became assistant private secretary to Anthony Eden. He was back in Athens early in World War II, but was then attached to the staff of Harold Macmillan, Britain's representative at Allied headquarters in North Africa. The Greek Civil War once again saw him in that country, and by 1945 his services earned him recognition on the Birthday Honours List.

Caccia was Ambassador to Austria from 1951 to 1954, and from 1956 to 1961 Ambassador to the United States. He was sent to Washington to repair relations badly damaged by the Suez crisis of 1956. The breakdown in mutual confidence arose when Britain and France joined an Israeli invasion of Egypt and sent military forces to capture the Suez Canal, which had been nationalised by President Gamal Abdel Nasser of Egypt. In the years that followed, he was instrumental in restoring and nurturing the "special relationship" between London and Washington.

His daughter Clarissa married David Pryce-Jones, son of Alan Pryce-Jones and Thérèse Fould-Springer ("Poppy").

In 1961, he became Permanent Under-Secretary of State, an office he held until 1965. He was Provost of Eton 1965-78 and President of the Marylebone Cricket Club (MCC) in 1973–74.

He was knighted in 1950, and was created a life peer with the title Baron Caccia, of Abernant in the County of Brecknock, on 11 May 1965. Caccia was appointed a Bailiff Grand Cross and Lord Prior of the Order of the Hospital of St John of Jerusalem, a Knight Grand Cross of the Royal Victorian Order and a Knight Grand Cross of the Order of St Michael and St George. Lord Caccia was a Knight of the International Order of St. Hubertus.

Notes

References 

1905 births
1990 deaths
People from Pachmarhi
People educated at Eton College
Alumni of Trinity College, Oxford
Bailiffs Grand Cross of the Order of St John
Knights Grand Cross of the Royal Victorian Order
Knights Grand Cross of the Order of St Michael and St George
Caccia

Diplomatic peers
Ambassadors of the United Kingdom to the United States
Ambassadors of the United Kingdom to Austria
Members of HM Diplomatic Service
Chairs of the Joint Intelligence Committee (United Kingdom)
People educated at Summer Fields School
Permanent Under-Secretaries of State for Foreign Affairs
Provosts of Eton College
Presidents of the Marylebone Cricket Club
English cricketers
Oxfordshire cricketers
Oxford University RFC players
Life peers created by Elizabeth II
20th-century British diplomats
British people in colonial India